Kurt Andrew Stillwell (born June 4, 1965) is an American former Major League Baseball (MLB) infielder. He played for the Cincinnati Reds, San Diego Padres, Kansas City Royals, California Angels and Texas Rangers from 1986 to 1993 and in 1996.

Biography
Stillwell was born in Glendale, California. He attended Thousand Oaks High School in Thousand Oaks, California, graduating in 1983. The Cincinnati Reds selected Stillwell with the second pick in that year's MLB draft.

Stillwell was selected to the American League All-Star team in 1988 as a member of the Royals. After his playing career, he became a fishing guide and later worked as an advisor to the Scott Boras Corporation. Stillwell's father, infielder Ron Stillwell, played for the Washington Senators in 1961 and 1962.

See also
 List of second-generation Major League Baseball players

References

External links

Cincinnati Reds players
San Diego Padres players
California Angels players
Texas Rangers players
Kansas City Royals players
Baseball players from California
American League All-Stars
1965 births
Living people
People from Glendale, California
Major League Baseball shortstops
Billings Mustangs players
Cedar Rapids Reds players
Denver Zephyrs players
Indianapolis Indians players
Oklahoma City 89ers players
Sportspeople from Ventura County, California